The Eastern Ganga dynasty also known as Purba Gangas, Rudhi Gangas or Prachya Gangas were a large medieval era Indian royal Hindu dynasty that reigned from Kalinga from as early as the 5th century to the mid 20th century. Eastern Gangas ruled much of the modern region of Odisha in three different phases by the passage of time, known as Early Eastern Gangas (493–1077), Imperial Eastern Gangas (1077–1436) and Khemundi Gangas (1436–1947). They are known as "Eastern Gangas" to distinguish them from the Western Gangas who ruled over Karnataka. The territory ruled by the dynasty consisted of the whole of the modern-day Indian state of Odisha, as well as major parts of north Andhra Pradesh, parts of Chhattisgarh and some southern districts of West Bengal. Odia language got official status in their regime following the evolution of the language from Odra Prakrit. The early rulers of the dynasty ruled from Dantapuram; the capital was later moved to Kalinganagara (modern Mukhalingam), and ultimately to Kataka (modern Cuttack) and then to Paralakhemundi.

Today, they are most remembered as the builders of the world renowned Jagannath Temple of Puri and Konark Sun Temple situated in Odisha, as well as the Madhukeshwara temple of Mukhalingam, Nrusinghanath Temple at Simhachalam in erstwhile Kalinga and present-day Andhra Pradesh and  Ananta Vasudeva Temple at Bhubaneswar. The Gangas have constructed several temples besides the ones stated above.

The rulers of Eastern Ganga dynasty defended their kingdom from the constant attacks of the Muslim invaders. This kingdom prospered through trade and commerce and the wealth was mostly used in the construction of temples. The rule of the dynasty came to an end under the reign of King Bhanudeva IV (c. 1414–34), in the early 15th century and then Khemundi Ganga started ruling up to abolition of zamindari in modern India. The Eastern Ganga dynasty is said to be the longest reigning dynasty in Odisha. Their currency was called Ganga Fanams and was similar to that of the Cholas and Eastern Chalukyas of southern India.

Origin 
As per B. Masthanaiah, the origin of the Eastern Gangas is not clearly established. However, renowned British scholar, artist, art critic, historian, archaeologist, and an authority on Indian art and architecture, Percy Brown, suggested that the temples of Mukhalingam predated the temples of Bhubaneswar (this is unexplained as Bhubaneswar contains several temples predating Mukhalingam) and had been built as per the Badami Chalukya Temple Architecture originating from Karnataka since the 4th century CE and they were followed as a specimen model by the Odia craftsmen in constructing temples in their Trikalinga (Odisha) region during the reign of Eastern Gangas, Gajapati empire and later on. A certain temple tower in Odisha shows a combination of both Rekha and Pidha Deul decoration types which was taken from the Kadamba temples of Karnataka where it first appeared. The Mukhalingam (Kalinganagara) Madhukeswara (Mukhalingeswara) temple too resembles the Kadamba temples of Karnataka. The towns of Aihole, Badami and Pattadakal had emerged as 'The Cradle of Indian Temple Architecture and Hindu Rock Architecture, Stone Artwork and Construction Techniques' since the 4th century CE. The script used by the Eastern Ganga king Indravarma of the 7th century CE, like his predecessors, is the common Kannada-Telugu script used also by the Chalukyas of Badami and their related subordinate Vengi Chalukya branch. All these indicate a strong proof for the Eastern Gangas having originated from the earlier Western Gangas (established c. 350 CE) of Karnataka. 

According to the historian Upinder Singh, In the 4th century CE, Orissa was divided into several small principalities, some of which owed allegiance to the Guptas. Dynasties such as the Pitribhaktas, Matharas, and Vasishthas rose to power in southern Orissa. The 5th century saw the rise of the Eastern Gangas in south Kalinga. These kings were probably a branch of the Western Gangas and were migrants from Karnataka.

The Korni and Vishakhapatnam copper plates of 1113 AD and 1118/1119 AD respectively both of Anantavarman Chodaganga, the Dasgoba copper plate of Rajaraja III of 1198/99 AD and the Nagari copperplate of Anangabhima III and other such records trace the ancestry of the Eastern Gangas to Kamarnava I. The Kendupatna copper plate of Narasimhadeva II and the Puri copper plate of Narasimhadeva IV also state that Kamarnava came from Gangawadi province, now in Karnataka. The Korni copper plate mentions that Kamarnava I came to the Mahendra mountain situated to the east of Gangawadi and then onwards to Kalinga. It also states that Kamarnava I, the eldest son of Virasimha, had left Kolahalapura (Kuvalalapura or Kolar), the capital of Gangawadivisaya (Western Ganga kingdom in southern Karnataka) after giving up his rightful throne to his paternal uncle. He set forth eastwards along with his four brothers to establish a new kingdom, reached and ascended the mountain summit of Mahendra, worshipped Shiva as God Gokarnaswamin or Gokarneswara, obtained the bull (Nandi) emblem, descended to the eastern side, defeated and killed the local tribal king Sabaraditya (Savaraditya) or Baladitya in battle and acquired the whole of Kalinga with the blessings of Gokarneswara. Historian Bhairabi Prasad Sahu states that the Gangas after conquering the area south of Mahendragiri mountain around 498-500 CE, acknowledged a deity of the Saora (Savara or Sabara) tribe on the Mahendragiri mountain with the name of Shiva-Gokarnaswamin as the patron deity of their family.

Epigraphist, John Faithfull Fleet has identified Gangawadi and Kolahalapuram with the Ganga Dynasty (founded in 350 CE) and Kolar, ruled by the Western Gangas. Both the early and the later Eastern Ganga kings had close relations with the Eastern Kadambas, who functioned under them as chieftains, heads and provincial governors. Most of the early as well as the later Eastern Ganga kings of Kalinga worshipped the holy feet of Gokarneswara of Mahendragiri. This deity also has a strong Karnataka connection through the Mahabaleshwar Temple situated in Gokarna (Karnataka) which is the only Atmalinga of God Shiva in the entire world. The Eastern Kadamba family, feudatories of the Early Gangas in the 10th and early 11th century CE, were ruling a small area in the vicinity of the Mahendra mountain.

Historian Dineshwar Singh lists several facts that point to a relationship between the Eastern and the Western Gangas. Just as the Gangas and the Kadambas of Karnataka had marital relationship with each other, so were the Gangas and the Kadambas of Kalinga. The family God of the Kadambas of Vaijayanti (Banavasi), Palasige and Hangal (all in Karnataka) is described in their inscriptions as Jayanti (Vaijayanti) Madhukeshwara of Banavasi. Historian M. Somasekhara Sarma suggests that the Kadambas brought with them their family God Madhukeshwara into their new home Kalinga. It appears that Kamarnava II built the temple of Madhukeshwara in Nagara at the instance of one of his feudatories and relatives, the Eastern Kadambas. Historian G. R. Varma further suggests that the Eastern Ganga king Kamarnava II renovated the existing temple of Gokarneshwara before renaming it as Madhukeshwara. Historian R. Subba Rao states that the God Madhukeswara of Kalinganagara was also called Jayanteswara (based on Vaijayanti or Banavasi town) or Gokarneshwara (Gokarna's Mahabaleshwar deity) in some of the inscriptions found in that temple. Somasekhara Sarma states that the Eastern Kadambas probably came to Kalinga from the districts of Dharwad, Belagavi and Ratnagiri. He substantiates it by showing the presence of a village named as a crude distortion of the Kannada place name Palasige (Halasi or Palasi in Old Kannada), as Palasa (Palasika) in the Kalinga region. Most of the early Western Gangas were Shaivas, just like the early and the later Eastern Gangas of Kalinga were.

Also, while the bardic traditions of the Western Ganga dynasty claim descent from the Sun through the Ikshavaku dynasty, the Eastern Ganga genealogies ascribe descent from the Moon; the Chandravamsa lineage. Unlike the Western Ganga Dynasty who traced their lineage to the Solar Dynasty, the Later Eastern Gangas claimed a lunar descent from Vishnu through Brahma, Atri and Chandra (moon).

Dineshwar Singh concludes that in spite of the views and arguments against a relationship between the two Ganga dynasties - the Western and the Eastern Gangas, the similarities listed out between them strongly indicate that the founder of the Eastern Ganga dynasty travelled from the Gangawadi province of Karnataka and arrived in Trikalinga. Historians R. S. Sharma and K. M. Shrimali state that several ruling families of Kannada origin flourished and ruled Odisha like the Eastern Gangas, the Eastern Kadambas, the Rashtrakuta branch of Odisha which ruled from Vagharakotta fort probably in the Sambalpur region and the Tailapa-Vamsis (ruled around Ganjam and Parlakimidi) who migrated during or after 973 CE on the establishment of the Kalyani Chalukya empire and were their feudatories. Some suspect them to have come along with Vikramaditya VI's campaigns across north, central, east and north east India, sometime before 1063-68 CE.
Five prominent dominions of the Kalingan Prachya Ganga family are identified from five different administrative centers namely - Kalinganagara (Srikakulam), Svetaka Mandala (Ganjam), Giri Kalinga (Simhapur), Ambabadi Mandala (Gunupur, Rayagada) and Vartanni Mandala (Hinjilikatu, Ganjam). The heartland of the Prachya Gangas had three parts of Kalinga namely, Daksina Kalinga (Pithapura), Madhya Kalinga (Yellamanchili Kalinga or Visakhapatnam) and Uttara Kalinga (districts of Srikakulam, Ganjam, Gajapati and Rayagada). The earliest known prominent king was Indravarman who is known from his Jirjingi copper plate grant. The Godavari grant of Raja Prthivimalla and the Ramatirtham grant of Vishnukundina king Indrbhattaraka refer to a war of four tusked elephants or Chaturdanta Samara in which Indravarman I the son of Mitavarman, a Ganga general of Vakataka king and a local ruler of Dantapura commanded an alliance of small South Kalingan kingdoms against the powerful Vishnukundina king Indrabhattaraka, defeated and killed him. The Vishnukundins returned with a vengeance, defeated the Vakataka King and members of the alliance while Indravarman declared himself as Tri-Kalingadhipati (the lord of the three Kalingas) rising from obscurity and moving his capital northwards away from the attacking Vishnukundins. His son Hastivarman found himself stuck between two Gupta feudal dynasties of Odisha, the Vigrahas of South Toshali and Mudgalas. Joining the onslaught like his father, he commanded major battles against the Vigrahas and won territories in the northern parts of ancient Kalinga and declared himself as Sakala-Kalingadhipati (the ruler of whole Kalinga). The dynasty though remaining to be a strong ruling family in ancient Odisha and North Andhra Pradesh continued to remain as vassal rulers under the central authority of the Bhauma-Kara dynasty which is proven by the fact that a smaller Eastern Ganga king belonging to the clan and named as Jayavarmadeva mentioned himself as the vassal of Sivakara Deva I in his Ganjam grant and by whose permission he gave away the grants.

It was during the rule of Anantavarman Vajrahasta V in the mid eleventh century that the clan started emerging as a major military power challenging the authority of the Somavanshi Dynasty at their northern frontiers and allying with their arch rivals the Kalchuris. After a series of victories in battle and making land grants to three hundred Brahmin families in his kingdom, Vajrahasta V assumed the titles as Trikalingadhipati (lord of the three Kalingas) and Sakalakalingadhipati (lord of complete Kalinga) challenging the centralized authority of the Somavanshis and laying the foundation to an imperial era for the Eastern Gangas. In the later years of the century, Devendravarman Rajaraja I defeated the Somavanshi king Mahasivagupta Janmenjaya II completely while challenging the Cholas in battle, along with establishing authority in the Vengi region. The Cholas were defeated by Rajaraja I and Chola princess, Rajasundari, was married off to the Eastern Ganga king as a goodwill gesture for settlement of affairs between the Cholas and the Gangas.

The identification of the father of Rajasundari is a matter of great controversy and some scholars like K. A. Nilakanta Sastri identify the king as Virarajendra Chola. After the sudden death of Rajaraja I, his underage sons Chodaganga Deva ascended the throne, losing the many parts of his ancestral kingdom to the Cholas who were now in an advantageous position. However, Ananatavarman Chodaganga Deva not only lived a young life of prolonged struggles and setbacks but finally managed to completely remove the Chola presence from the region and finally securing Utkala, Kalinga, Gauda, Radha and Vengi as one kingdom. While many of his inscriptions are found inside the limits of former Vengi kingdom, this large extent of his empire from Bengal to Vengi is clearly stated in his Korni grant inscriptions. In the Sri Kurmam temple grant of Chodaganga, it is clearly stated that he has extended his territory from Bhagirathi Ganga to Gautami Ganga rivers which is literally the region between river Ganga and Godavari. The only front where he faced setbacks is against his western rivals the Kalachuris where he was unsuccessful. His descendant Anangabhima Deva III gradually completed the task of defeating the Kalachuris completely. In his Korni copper plate grant he mentions himself to be the lord of 99,000 war elephants which while counting military strength according to the ancient Gulma system of military divisions, puts his strength to a million men and half a million animals employed to his command. Due to his maternal relation with the Cholas, a Chola uncle of Chodaganga by the name Virachoda had sided by him as a protective guardian against the invading Cholas since his childhood. Chodaganga was married to the daughter of this uncle and also had Tamil officers serving him during his lifelong affairs of war and administration. Chodaganga Deva not only reunited most of ancient Kalinga stretching from the rivers Ganga to Godavari but led the foundation to the imperial hegemony of the Eastern Gangas in the Eastern coast of India. Chodaganga Deva was a strong king and was the son of Rajaraja Devendravarman and grandson of Vajrahasta Anantavarman of the Imperial Gangas of Kalinganagara. His mother was princess Rajasundari of the Chola dynasty.

History

After the fall of Mahameghavahana dynasty, Kalinga was divided into different kingdoms under feudatory chiefs. Each of these chiefs bore the title Kalingadhipathi (Lord of Kalinga). The beginnings of what became the Eastern Ganga dynasty came about when Indravarma I defeated the Vishnukundin king, Indrabhattaraka and established his rule over the region with Kalinganagara (or Mukhalingam) as his capital, and Dantapuram as a secondary capital. The Ganga kings assumed various titles viz. Trikalingadhipathi or Sakala Kalingadhipathi (Lord of three Kalinga or all three Kalingas namely Kalinga proper (South), Utkala (North), and Dakshina Kosala (West)).

Mukhalingam near Srikakulam of Andhra Pradesh bordering Odisha has been identified as Kalinganagara, the capital of the early Eastern Gangas.

After the decline of the early Eastern Gangas reign, the Chalukyas of Vengi took control of the region. The first monarch of the dynasty Vajrahastha Aniyakabhima I (980-1015 A.D), took advantage of the internal strife and revived the power of the Ganga dynasty. It was during their rule that Shaivism took precedence over Buddhism and Jainism. The magnificent Srimukhalingam Temple at Mukhalingam was built during this period.

In the 11th century, the Cholas brought the Ganga Kingdom under their rule with the sudden death of Devendravarman Rajraja I. His son Chodaganga Deva who ascended the throne at the age of five under the protection provide by one of his maternal uncles from the Chola family had to overcome multiple obstacles before securing Kalinga, Vengi, Utkala, Odra and parts of Bengal as one kingdom.

Intermarriage
The Eastern Gangas were known to have intermarried with the Cholas, Chalukyas. The early state of the dynasty may have started from the early 5th century.

Anantavarman Chodaganga

The dynasty, towards the end of eleventh century came to be known as Chodaganga dynasty after its founder Anantavarman Chodaganga. He was the son of Rajaraja Deva, the ruler of Kalinga kingdom centered around the region of Southern Odisha and northern Andhra coast, while his mother was the Chola princess, Rajasundari, daughter of the Chola emperor Virarajendra Chola.

He is believed to have ruled from the Ganges River in the north to the Godavari River in the south, thus laying the foundation of the Eastern Ganga Dynasty. Also during his rule, the great Jagannath Temple at Puri was built. He assumed the title of Trikalingadhipathi (ruler of the three Kalingas which comprise Kalinga proper, Utkala north and Koshala west) in 1076 CE, resulting in him being the first to rule all three divisions of Kalinga.

Anantavarman was a religious person as well as a patron of art and literature. He is credited for having built the famous Jagannath Temple of Puri in Odisha. King Anantavarman Chodagangadeva was succeeded by a long line of illustrious rulers such as Narasingha Deva I (1238–1264).

Successors
Rajaraja III ascended the throne in 1198 and did nothing to resist the Ghurid Empire Muslims of the Khalji dynasty of Bengal, who invaded Orissa in 1206. Rajaraja's son Anangabhima III, however, repulsed the Muslims and built the temple of Megheswara at Bhuvaneshvara.

Narasimhadeva I, the son of Anangabhima, invaded southern Bengal in 1243, defeated its Muslim ruler of the Delhi Sultanate, captured the capital (Gauda), and built the Sun Temple at Konark to commemorate his victory. Narasimhadeva I was also the first king to use the title of "Gajapati" or "Lord of war elephants" or "King with an army of elephants" among the Odishan kings in the 1246 CE inscription at the Kapilash Temple.

With the death of Narasimha in 1264, the Eastern Gangas began to decline; the sultan of Delhi, Firuz Shah Tughlaq, invaded Odisha between 1353 and 1358, and levied tribute on the Ganga king. The Musunuri Nayaks defeated the Odishan powers in 1356. Narasimha IV, the last known king of the Eastern Ganga dynasty, ruled until 1425. The "mad king," Bhanudeva IV, who succeeded him, left no inscriptions; his minister Kapilendra usurped the throne and founded the Suryavamsha dynasty in 1434–35.

List of Rulers 
The following is the list of Eastern Ganga rulers:

Indravarman I is earliest known Independent king of the dynasty. He is known from the Jirjingi Copper Plate Grant.

Kalinga Rulers (c. 498 – 1077 CE) 

 Mittavarman (c. ??–498 CE)
(Eastern Ganga king, feudal under Vakataka rule)
Indravarman I (c. 498–537) (Real founder of dynasty)
 Samantavarman (c. 537–562)
 Hastivarman (c. 562–578)
 Indravarman II (c. 578–589)
 Danarnava (c. 589–652)
 Indravarman III (c. 652–682)
 Gunarnava (c. 682–730)
 Devendravarman I (c. 730–780)
 Anantavarman III (c. 780–812)
 Rajendravarman II (c. 812–840)
 Devendravarman V (c. 840–895)
 Gunamaharnava I (c. 895–910)
 Vajrahasta II (or Anangabhimadeva I) (c. 910–939)
 Gundama - I (c. 939–942)
 Kamarnava I (c. 942–977)
 Vinayaditya (c. 977–980)
 Vajrahasta IV (c. 980–1015)
 Kamarnava II (c. 1015, 6 months)
 Gundama II (c. 1015–1018)
 Madhukamarnava (c. 1018–1038)
 Vajrahasta V (c. 1038–1070)
 Rajaraja Deva I (c. 1070–1077)

Trikalinga Rulers (c. 1077 – 1436 CE) 

 Anantavarman Chodaganga (c. 1077–1150)
 Kamarnnava Deva (c. 1150–1156)
 Raghava Deva (c. 1156–1170)
 Rajaraja Deva II (c. 1170–1190)
 Anangabhima Deva II (c. 1190–1198)
 Rajraja Deva III (c. 1198–1211)
 Anangabhima Deva III (c. 1211–1238)
 Narasimha Deva I (1238–1264)
 Bhanu Deva I (1264–1278)
 Narasimha Deva II (1279–1306)
 Bhanu Deva II (1306–1328)
 Narasimha Deva III (1328–1352)
 Bhanu Deva III (1352–1378)
 Narasimha Deva IV (1378–1414)
 Bhanu Deva IV (1414–1436) (Last ruler of dynasty)

Regnal year system (Anka year)

The Anka year ( Aṅka) system is a unique regnal year system instituted by the kings of the Eastern Ganga dynasty for dating their reigns. It has a number of unique features that calculates the regnal year different from that actual duration of the year elapsed during the reign. The system still survives today and is used in the Odia calendar (panjis) and the regnal year is marked by the titular reign of the current Gajapati Maharaja of the House of Gajapati at Puri.

Coinage

The Eastern Ganga coinage consisted of gold fanams. The obverse typically depicts a couchant bull along with other symbols. The reverse features a symbol which represents the letter sa (for samvat, which means year) flanked by elephant goads or an elephant goad with a battle axe, along with a number below, which depicts the regnal year(anka year) of the reigning monarch. Some coins also carry the legend śrī rāma on the reverse above the letter sa.

An interesting aspect of the Eastern Ganga coin dates is that these coins may be the earliest Hindu coins using decimal numbers for dating. Earlier dated coins, such as those of the Western Satraps, the Guptas etc., used the old Brahmic numbering system with separate symbols representing each of the single digits, separate symbols representing two-digit multiples of ten, such as 20, 30, 40, and so on, and further separate symbols representing three-digit numbers such as 100, 200, etc. Thus a number like 123 was written as 100-20-3. But the Eastern Ganga coins were written using the symbols for the single digits, with the position of the number indicating the value such as tens or hundreds, thus effectively using the Zero-place holder system.

Legacy
By successfully defeating the invasion attempts of Muslim invaders, the Eastern Ganga Empire is attributed to have served as the conservatory of the Hindu religion, art and culture at a time when India's indigenous civilization was endangered through the large scale massacre of Hindus, plundering of cities, desecration and destruction of temples and forcible conversions of the Hindu populace. The Ganga Empire also harbored the fleeing culture and art from other parts of India.

The Eastern Gangas were great patrons of religion and the arts, and the temples of the Ganga period rank among the masterpieces of Kalinga and Hindu architecture.

Descendants

 Early Gangas
 Imperial Gangas
 Paralakhemundi branch
 Badakhemundi branch
 Sanakhemundi branch
 Hindol branch
 Bamanda branch
 Gangas of Svetaka Mandala
 Chikiti branch

Paralakhemundi branch

A branch of the Eastern Ganga dynasty survived as the kings of the Paralakhemundi state, currently part of the Gajapati district,Odisha. It was established in 14th century when Narashingha Deba, a son of the Eastern Ganga monarch Bhanudeva II established the Khemudi kingdom. Scions of this line include, 
 Jagannatha Gajapati Narayana Deo II (Reign: 1751 CE - 1771 CE)- who ascended to the throne at a time when Odisha was torn apart due conflicts between external powers like the Mughals, Marathas, French and British for control of the territory in 18th century.
 Krushna Chandra Gajapati (Reign as Maharaja of Paralakhemundi: 26 April 1913 - 25 May 1974)- who was a key personality and regarded as the architect of an Independent united Odisha State and went on to become the first Prime Minister of Orissa province formed in 1936. Prime Minister in office from 1 April 1937 to 19 July 1937 and 2nd time from 29 November 1941 to 29 June 1944. The present-day Gajapati District of Odisha which was earlier a part of the historic Ganjam district was named after him.
 Gopinath Gajapati (Titular Maharaja: 25 May 1974 - 10 January 2020)- served as the member of the 9th and 10th Lok Sabha of India and represented the Berhampur constituency of Odisha. 
 Kalyani Gajapati (Titular Maharani since 10 January 2020)-  current head of the dynasty.

Badakhemundi and Sanakhemundi branch

This line descends from the Paralakhemundi Ganga branch. In 16th century, the Raja of Parlakhemundi, Subarnalinga Bhanu Deba granted parts of the Khimedi areas to his son Ananga Kesari Ramachandra Deba, whose descendants in turn divided the zamindari into two branches- Badakhemundi and Sanakhemundi.

Hindol branch

The Hindol princely state was established in 1554 by two brothers, Chandradeva Jenamani and Udhavadeva Jenamani belonging to the family of the Badakhemundi Raja of Ganjam. The kingdom acceded to India and merged into the state of Odisha following independence in 1947.

Bamanda branch

The Bamra kingdom was established by Saraju Gangadeb who was the son of the local Eastern Ganga administrator of Patna region Hattahamir Deb, who was the son of Eastern Ganga ruler Bhanudeva II. Hattahamir Deb was overthrown in 1360 CE by Ramai Deva of the Chauhan dynasty who led the foundation of Patna state, while the tribal chieftains installed Saraju Gangadeb as the ruler of Bamanda region. This laid the foundation of the Bamanda branch of the Eastern Ganga dynasty. The kingdom acceded to India and merged into the state of Odisha following independence in 1947.

Chikiti branch

This branch were the descendants of the ancient branch of Svetaka mandala of the Early Gangas which became the Chikiti zamindari. Historians conclude that the rulers of Chikiti were from the line of Ganga ruler Hastivarman.

Gallery

See also
 List of rulers of Odisha

References

External links

 The Origin of Eastern Ganga Dynasty
 History of Srikakulam (Kalinga)
 Coins of the Eastern Gangas
 

 
History of Andhra Pradesh
Dynasties of India
Hindu dynasties
History of Odisha
Dynasties of Odisha
Medieval Bengal
Former kingdoms